This is a list of crossings of the Danube river, from its source in Germany to its mouth in the Black Sea. Next to each bridge listed is information regarding the year in which it was constructed and for what use it was constructed (foot bridge, bicycle bridge, road bridge or railway bridge), and the distance from the mouth of the river in kilometres where available. 

Bridges not primarily intended for public use but which have limited access (generally only in the daytime and only for bicycle and foot traffic) are not included.

Crossings

Germany

Austria

Slovakia

Slovak–Hungarian border

Hungary

Croatian–Serbian border

Serbia

Romanian–Serbian border

Bulgarian–Romanian border

Romania

Gallery

See also 
 List of bridges

References

External links

This article includes information translated from the German-language Wikipedia article :de:Liste der Donaubrücken. The German-language article cites the following sources:
  Liste sämtlicher Brücken über die Donau (PDF) – Quelle: donauschifffahrt.info
  Liste der Schleusen – Quelle: donauschifffahrt.info /
  Die Donau ~ Faszination eines Flusses
  Die interaktive Kulturkarte entlang der Donau
  Arbeitsgemeinschaft Donauländer
  Wiener Donaubrücken
  Donaubrücken bei brueckenbau-links.de

 
Danube
Danube
Danube